Yin Khwin Nan Taw is a 1997 Burmese drama film, directed by Malikha Soe Htike Aung starring Nyunt Win, Dwe, Htun Eaindra Bo and Nandar Hlaing.

Cast
Nyunt Win as Dr. Banyar
Dwe as Ye Dike
Htun Eaindra Bo as Thi Tagu
Nandar Hlaing as Hay Thar
Yan Naung as Ye Soe
Hnin Si as Daw Mya Thet
May Thu Zaw as May Tharaphu

References

1997 films
1990s Burmese-language films
Burmese drama films
Films shot in Myanmar
1997 drama films